Kasan or KASAN may refer to:

Places
Kasan, Iran, a village in Gilan Province, Iran
Kāsān, a village in Gilan Province, Iran

Other uses
KernelAddressSanitizer (KASAN), a Linux kernel feature
1316 Kasan, a Mars-crossing asteroid
Kasan Soleh (born 1982), Indonesian association football player

See also
Kazan (disambiguation)
Kesan, a village in Golestan Province, Iran